Newa cuisine (also referred to as Newar cuisine) is a subset of Nepalese cuisine that has developed over centuries among the Newars of Kathmandu (Kathmandu is called Yen in Nepal Bhasa) in Nepal. Newa cuisine is the most celebrated food variety in the country that consists of over 200 dishes. It is more elaborate than most Nepalese cuisines because the Kathmandu Valley has exceptionally fertile alluvial soil and enough wealthy households to make growing produce more profitable than cultivating rice and other staples.

Food is the integral part of Newar culture. Different kind of foods are prepared for different occasions, considering the climate and nutritional needs for body. Newars are renowned for their sumptuous feasting. Dishes served during feasts and festivals have symbolic significance.

Lunch and dinner

Jā (boiled rice)

Meat dishes
Choila (ground buffalo meat)
Pālulā (buffalo meat and ginger curry)
Senlāmu (raw ground buffalo liver seasoned with spices)

Vegetable dishes
Tarkāri (vegetable curry)
Wāunchā (green vegetables)
Tukan:chā
Palācha
Shākechā
Chōlechā

Soups
Ken (lentil soup)
Simi  (beans)
Mi  (fenugreek)
Aai ka (leftover rice after preparing rice beer)
Choohon (tama in Nepali) (bamboo shoot)

Relishes
losa (relish)

Lunch

Baji (beaten rice)
Chatānmari (rice flour crepe)
Chhusyā (parched wheat)
Gophuki (puffed rice)
Gwaramari (deep-fried dough)
Hājā (steamed rice)
Jākimari (rice flour pancake)
Kani (popcorn)
Kheyn wo (fried egg)
Musyā (roasted soybean)
Sukulā (dried meat)
Wo (fried lentil cake)
Bara (fried lentil cake with a hole like a donut)

Feast foods

Meat dishes

Dāyekālā (buffalo meat curry)
Dugulā (goat meat curry)
Heynlā (duck curry)
Bandella (wild boar meat)
Changrala (mountain goat meat)
Khasilā (gelded goat meat)
Nyā (fish curry)
Sanya (small fish)
Chohi (steamed buffalo blood)
Janlā (marinated diced with skin raw meat)
Kachilā (marinated raw minced buffalo meat)
Khāyālā (chicken curry)
Me (buffalo tongue boiled, sliced and fried)
Pangra
Nhyapu (brains boiled, sliced and fried)
Nyāpukā (fried fish)
Pukālā (fried meat intestine, e.g. liver, heart etc.)
Sanyā-khunā (spicy jellied fish soup)
Sapu mhichā (leaf tripe bag stuffed with bone marrow)
Swan pukā (goat lungs filled with batter and boiled, sliced and fried)
Takhā (jellied buffalo meat curry)

Vegetable dishes

Buba kwā (beans curry)
Chhon kwā (curry of bamboo shoots and potato)
Kwāti (soup made of nine types of sprouted beans)
Mee kwā (curry of fenugreek seeds)
Pancha kwā (mixed vegetable curry of bamboo shoots, potato, dried mushroom, dried radish and blackeyed pea)

Soups
Bullā or ka kwā (soup made of the dregs of rice beer, diced spleen and other meats, bone marrow and bone)
Chhyāllā (soup made of shredded pickled radish and diced variety meats)
Pāun kwā (sour soup of Himalayan hog plum)

Festival foods

Samaybaji (set of beaten rice, roasted meat, vegetables, cowpea, soybean and ginger)
Syābaji (parched rice)

Meat dishes

Chhoylā (either boiled or smoked, sliced and marinated buffalo meat)
Ghalmal (mixed curry of diced lentil cake, green vegetables and leftover meat seasoned with Nepal pepper) 
Hāku Chhoylā (roasted, diced and marinated buffalo meat)
Momochā (dumplings filled with minced buffalo or chicken meat)*
Kunyā (smoked fish)

Vegetable dishes
Chākuhi (boiled sweet potato)
Hāku Musyā (roasted black soybean mixed with oil and salt)
Lābhā (chopped garlic greens mixed with spices)
Pālu (diced raw ginger)

Salads

Kaywu (soaked field pea and garden pea)
Lain (sliced radish)
Tusi (sliced cucumber)
  laaie   (sliced radish )

Dessert
Dhau (yogurt)
Juju Dhau (yogurt/curd originated from Bhaktapur)
Marichari (may include anything sweet from soft milk based pastries to fried bread dipped in caramel)
Laakhamari (made from flour and sugar, cooked in hot oil)
Guulmari (made from flour and sugar, cooked in hot oil)
Baalbara
Yomari (made from chaku and floor and steamed like momo)
Anarsha 
Ainthe-Mari
Khajuri 
Roowth
Fini
Nimki
Lakshmimari
Swaari
Malpha
Jeeri
Gud-Paak
Chimti 
Aiti Mari

Drinks

Aylā (liquor)
Arak (rice beer)
kaar-Thwon (brown beer)
hyam-Thwon (red beer)

Utensils
Newars cook, store and serve food and beverages in containers and utensils made of gold, silver, copper, brass, iron, clay pottery, dried rice stalks, corn leaves and leaves of certain trees sewn together with toothpicks to make plates and bowls. Food is eaten with bare hands. It is customary to wash hands before and after a meal.

Anti (alcohol jar)
Bātā (basin)
Chupi (knife)
Dhampo (water pot)
Hāsā (round winnowing tray)
Karuwā (water jug)
Kholā (bowl)
Sali (small clay bowl)
Somā (earthen wine pitcher)

See also
 List of Nepalese dishes

References

External links
 http://www.gorkhapatra.org.np/detail.php?article_id=14534&cat_id=10 
 http://www.nepalitimes.com/issue/2003/08/29/Leisure/3918
 http://www.weallnepali.com/recipe/newari-food
 http://www.gfcookingclub.com/tag/newari-food/
 https://www.slowfood.com/worldfood-momo-nepals-most-popular-food/#:~:text=The%20history%20of%20momo%20in,in%20the%20late%20fifteenth%20century.